Henry Clinton Hunt was a member of the Wisconsin State Assembly.

Biography
Hunt was born on January 27, 1840, in Bradford, Pennsylvania. After residing in Limestone, New York, from 1848 to 1854, he settled in Reedsburg, Wisconsin. During the American Civil War, he served with the 20th Illinois Volunteer Infantry Regiment of the Union Army, achieving the rank of sergeant. Events Hunt took part in include the Battle of Fredericktown, the Battle of Fort Henry and the Battle of Shiloh. He was a merchant by trade. Hunt died in 1908.

Political career
Hunt was a member of the Assembly during the 1891 and 1893 sessions. Other positions he held include postmaster, town treasurer and member of the village board (similar to city council) of Reedsburg, now a city. He was a Democrat.

References

People from Bradford, Pennsylvania
People from Cattaraugus County, New York
People from Reedsburg, Wisconsin
Democratic Party members of the Wisconsin State Assembly
Wisconsin city council members
City and town treasurers in the United States
Wisconsin postmasters
People of Wisconsin in the American Civil War
Union Army soldiers
American merchants
Businesspeople from Wisconsin
1840 births
1908 deaths
19th-century American politicians
19th-century American businesspeople